Scotfield is an unincorporated community in east-central Alberta, Canada within Special Area No. 2. It is located on Highway 9 between the Town of Hanna and the Village of Youngstown.

Localities in Special Area No. 2